Tetiana Levytska-Shukvani (born 7 April 1990) is a Ukrainian-born Georgian judoka.

She is the bronze medallist of the 2014 Judo Grand Prix Tbilisi in the -52 kg category for Ukraine. However, she married a Georgian judoka and switched nationality to Georgia and is scheduled to participate for Georgia at the 2020 Summer Olympics.

References

External links
 

1990 births
Living people
Female judoka from Georgia (country)
Ukrainian female judoka
Judoka at the 2020 Summer Olympics
Olympic judoka of Georgia (country)
European Games competitors for Ukraine
Judoka at the 2015 European Games